Manuela Mager (later Holzapfel; born 11 July 1962 in Dresden, Bezirk Dresden, German Democratic Republic) is a German former pair skater.

Mager was a team with Uwe Bewersdorf in pair skating. She skated for the club SC Einheit Dresden and was representing East Germany. Her coach was Uta Hohenhaus The pair Mager/Bewersdorf was the first in the world to execute in competition a clean thrown loop. Mager finished her figure skating career 1980.

After her figure skating career she left East Germany and moved to Bavaria.

Results
pairs (with Bewersdorf)

References

External links

Pairs on Ice profile

1962 births
Living people
Sportspeople from Dresden
People from Bezirk Dresden
German female pair skaters
Sportspeople from Saxony
Olympic figure skaters of East Germany
Figure skaters at the 1980 Winter Olympics
Olympic bronze medalists for East Germany
Olympic medalists in figure skating
World Figure Skating Championships medalists
European Figure Skating Championships medalists
Medalists at the 1980 Winter Olympics
20th-century German women